Baruga, also known ambiguously as Bareji, is a Papuan language spoken in Oro Province, in the "tail" of Papua New Guinea. The four rather divergent dialects are Tafota, Daghoro, Bareji, Mado. They are part of the Binanderean family of the Trans–New Guinea phylum of languages.

References 

Languages of Oro Province
Greater Binanderean languages